Neon is the debut album by the British singer and ex-Coronation Street star Richard Fleeshman. It was released in November 2007. It debuted at number 71 on the UK Album Chart,

Fleeshman promoted the album by supporting Sir Elton John on two tours around the UK and Europe.

Track listing
"Coming Down"
"Play It down the Middle"
"Back Here"
"Skyline"
"Secret Smile"
"These Days"
"Hey Jealousy"
"Eighteen"
"Going Backwards"
"No Man's Land"
"Hold Me Close"

References

External links
HMV.com: albums: Neon (2007)

2007 albums